Colorado Pluck is a 1921 drama film directed by Jules Furthman. The film is based on the novel The Taming of Angela by George Goodchild. It is not known whether the film currently survives.

Plot
Newly wealthy Colorado Jim travels to London where he meets Angela Featherstone. The two get married despite Angela telling Jim that the marriage will be "in name only". Angela spends all of Jim's money not long after the wedding, causing the couple to move to Colorado. In Colorado, Jim clashes with Philip Meredith, who wants to steal Angela from him. After Jim is wounded, Angela realizes that she really loves Jim and decides to become more than just a wife "in name only".

Cast
William Russell as Colorado Jim
Margaret Livingston as Angela Featherstone
William Buckley as Reggie Featherstone
George Fisher as Philip Meredith
Helen Ware as Lady Featherstone
Bertram Johns as Lord Featherstone
Ray Berger as a Butler

References

External links

1921 films
American black-and-white films
1921 drama films
Silent American drama films
American silent feature films
1920s American films
Films set in London
Fox Film films
1920s English-language films